Transports may refer to:

 Military transport aircraft
 a Ministry of Transport
 Dow Jones Transportation Average
 The Transports, a folk ballad opera written by Peter Bellamy

See also
 
 Transport (disambiguation)